Édouard Rasoanaivo (born 20 February 1947) is a Malagasy middle-distance runner. He competed in the men's 800 metres at the 1972 Summer Olympics.

References

1947 births
Living people
Athletes (track and field) at the 1972 Summer Olympics
Malagasy male middle-distance runners
Olympic athletes of Madagascar
Place of birth missing (living people)